The 1916–17 Williams Ephs men's ice hockey season was the 14th season of play for the program.

Season

Roster

Standings

Schedule and Results

|-
!colspan=12 style=";" | Regular Season

References

Williams Ephs men's ice hockey seasons
Williams
Williams
Williams
Williams